Discovery Rupes is an escarpment on Mercury approximately  long and  high, located at latitude 56.3 S and longitude 38.3 W. It was formed by a thrust fault, thought to have occurred due to the shrinkage of the planet's core as it cooled over time. The scarp cuts through Rameau crater. It was discovered by Mariner 10.

The rupes are named after , the ship used by explorer James Cook on his third voyage.

References

Scarps on Mercury